Tonghe Station is a metro station on Line 3 of the Guangzhou Metro. The underground station is located at the intersection of Guangzhou Avenue and Tongsha Road in the Baiyun District of Guangzhou. It started operation on 30October 2010.

References

Railway stations in China opened in 2010
Guangzhou Metro stations in Baiyun District